George Kretsinger (June 20, 1844 - April 20, 1906) was a Union Army soldier in the American Civil War who received the U.S. military's highest decoration, the Medal of Honor.

Kretsinger was born in Fairfield, New York, and entered service in Chicago, Illinois. He was awarded the Medal of Honor, for extraordinary heroism shown in Henrico County, Virginia, for bravery in action during the Battle of Vicksburg, while serving as a Private with the Chicago Mercantile Battery in the Illinois Light Artillery on May 22, 1863. His Medal of Honor was issued on July 20, 1897.

Kretsinger died on April 20, 1906 and was buried at Rosehill Cemetery, in Cook County, Illinois.

Medal of Honor citation

References

External links

 

1844 births
1906 deaths
American Civil War recipients of the Medal of Honor
Burials at Rosehill Cemetery
People from Fairfield, New York
People of Illinois in the American Civil War
Union Army soldiers
United States Army Medal of Honor recipients